Vitālijs Rečickis (born 8 September 1986) is a Latvian footballer, currently playing for FK Jelgava in the Latvian Higher League.

Club career

Rečickis started his professional career in 2004 with RSK Dižvanagi. In 2008, he became a vital figure in the SK Blāzma's starting eleven and played almost all the matches. While playing for Blāzma, he was regarded to be one of the best free-kick takers in Latvian Higher League. He often scored from different positions and was one of his team's leaders and also the captain of the team. In December 2009 he went on trial with the Cypriot club Aris Limassol and just after Christmas that year he signed his first professional contract abroad.  He made 10 appearances, scoring no goals and was released in July, 2010.In September, 2010 he signed a contract with the Lithuanian A Lyga club FK Tauras Tauragė until the end of the season. He played 7 matches, scoring once. In February, 2011 he extend his contract for one more year. In summer 2011 returned to Latvia and signed for  FC Jūrmala. He played 28 matches, scoring 2 goals for Jūrmala. In January 2013 Rečickis joined the Latvian Higher League club Daugava Rīga. He played 24 league matches for the club and helped it reach the 4th place in the national championship. On 16 January 2014 it was announced that Rečickis had joined that time Latvian champions FK Ventspils.

International
He made his debut for Latvia national football team on 5 June 2018 in a friendly against Lithuania.

Honours
 Latvian Higher League champion (1): 2014

References

External links
 
 Profile at imscouting.com
 Profile at UEFA.com

1986 births
Living people
People from Rēzekne
Latvian people of Russian descent
Latvian footballers
Association football midfielders
Latvia international footballers
Latvian expatriate footballers
Expatriate footballers in Cyprus
Expatriate footballers in Lithuania
Latvian expatriate sportspeople in Lithuania
Latvian Higher League players
Cypriot First Division players
A Lyga players
RSK Dižvanagi players
SK Blāzma players
Aris Limassol FC players
FK Tauras Tauragė players
FC Jūrmala players
FK Daugava (2003) players
FK Ventspils players
FK Spartaks Jūrmala players
FK Jelgava players